Gennadi Vladimirovich Syomin (4 December 1967 – 8 June 2021) was a Russian professional football coach and player.

Club career
Syomin manages an amateur side FC Olimpik Novaya Usman. He made his professional debut in the Soviet Second League in 1984 for FShM Moscow. He played one game for FC Spartak Moscow in the Soviet Cup.

References

1967 births
Footballers from Moscow
2021 deaths
Soviet footballers
Association football midfielders
Russian footballers
FC Asmaral Moscow players
FC Spartak Moscow players
FC Lokomotiv Moscow players
FC Shinnik Yaroslavl players
FC Fakel Voronezh players
Russian Premier League players
FC Elista players
FC Rubin Kazan players
FC Salyut Belgorod players
Russian football managers
FC Fakel Voronezh managers
FC FShM Torpedo Moscow players
FC Torpedo Moscow players